Grey Seas, Grey Skies is a 1983 video game published by Simulations Canada.

Gameplay
Grey Seas, Grey Skies is a game in which tactical engagements between surface and submarine forces are simulated.

Reception
Jay Selover reviewed Grey Seas, Grey Skies and Fall Gelb for Computer Gaming World, and stated that "Both games are good simulations, and appear to be built on well researched data bases. They are both designed in presentation and content for the board gamer who now has a computer and wants to make use of its limited intelligence and rules adjudication abilities."

References

External links

Review in Softalk
Review in Tilt

1983 video games
Apple II games
Atari ST games
Commodore 64 games
Computer wargames
Naval video games
Simulations Canada video games
Submarine simulation video games
Video games developed in Canada